Matthew William Thomas (born August 4, 1994) is an American professional basketball player for Panathinaikos of the Greek Basket League and the EuroLeague. He played college basketball for the Iowa State Cyclones before starting his professional career in Europe, then moving to the NBA.

Early life and high school career
Matt Thomas was born in Decatur, Illinois. He grew up in Onalaska, Wisconsin, attending Onalaska High School. His mother had been a standout high school athlete herself. She was a swimmer, softball player, tennis player, and basketball star. She holds the school record for single game scoring at Wahlert High School in Dubuque, Iowa, with 48 points.

Thomas suffered tragedy at a young age. When he was 9 years old, his father, Greg, who suffered from alcoholism, died of suicide. Because of this Thomas developed a very strong relationship with his mother.

Thomas was an outstanding high school basketball player. He was named first-team all-state by the Associated Press as a junior in 2012. He averaged 21.3 points, 5.3 rebounds, 2.5 assists and 2.1 steals in 2012 to lead his team to the Division 2 state championship. Onalaska ended the year with a 27–1 record. Thomas scored 30 points in the state championship game, a 55–38 victory over Kaukauna. His senior year Thomas averaged 28.3 points and 9.7 rebounds, leading his team to the state semifinals and a 24–3 mark, shooting 50.4% percent from the field and 35.8% from beyond the arc. Thomas scored more than 40 points three times, including 41 points in the sectional final and a career-high 50 points in just 2 1/2 quarters vs. Tomah. He participated in the 2013 American Family Insurance High School 3-Point Championship, finishing third. Thomas ended his four-year career as a two-time first-team all-state pick with a 95–12 overall mark and over 2,000 points.

Recruitment
An outstanding scorer, Thomas was considered one of the best shooters in the class of 2013 and one of the best players from Wisconsin. A consensus top-100 national recruit, Thomas was ranked No. 51 by ESPN, No. 54 by Rivals.com, and No. 58 by Scout.com in the final national rankings.  Being highly sought after Thomas eventually chose Iowa State over Virginia, Minnesota, Boston College and Marquette.

Recruitment profile

College career

Freshman season
Thomas began his true freshman campaign as a starter for Iowa State. He is only the 20th ISU freshman to start a season opener. He started in the first 15 games before being replaced in the starting line-up by Monte Morris. Despite becoming the 6th man, Thomas still appeared in all 36 games that season. Over the season Thomas averaged 5.5 points, scored in double figures eight times, shot 33.6% from behind the arc. He made four three-pointers in games twice during the season. He made a three in 25 games with 44 three-pointers total, which is good enough for second-most by a Cyclone freshman.

Sophomore season
Thomas spent two days in jail following his arrest for an OWI on July 14, 2014. Thomas began his sophomore season serving a three-game suspension.< Due to increased bench depth his sophomore season, Thomas saw a slightly diminished role. He saw action in 32 total games, scoring in double figures nine times. He was third on the team with 32 three-pointers made. Thomas grabbed a career-high eight rebounds and hit 5–6 shots to score 13 points against Alabama in the season opener. He led the Cyclones in scoring for the first time in his career against Lamar, with 14 points. He scored a career-high 17 points at Texas, included 4–6 from the three-point range.

Junior season
Due to the season-ending injury of Naz Long, Thomas moved back into the starting lineup.

Professional career

Obradoiro CAB (2017–2018)
Thomas played for the Los Angeles Lakers 2017 summer league team. He scored 23 points on 8–9 shooting in the summer league title game to help the Lakers to a 110–98 victory.

On August 29, 2017, Thomas signed with Monbus Obradoiro of Spain's Liga ACB. In his first professional game of his career, Thomas recorded 21 points in 4-for-5 shooting from three-point line as he helped Obradoiro win against Zaragoza.

Valencia (2018–2019)
On July 11, 2018, Thomas signed a two-year deal with Valencia of Spain's Liga ACB. He had an effective field goal percentage of 99 percent on catch-and-shoot attempts when unguarded, picking up the nickname Mr. 99%.

Toronto Raptors (2019–2021)
On July 19, 2019, Thomas signed with the Toronto Raptors. On October 26, 2019, Thomas made his NBA debut, scoring six points and grabbing three rebounds, in the Raptors 108–84 win over the Chicago Bulls. On November 25, Thomas suffered a fractured finger on his left hand. He returned to action on January 6, 2020, suiting up on a rehab assignment for the Raptors 905, the Raptors' NBA G League affiliate. On January 7, Thomas returned to the Raptors lineup recording eight points and a career-high six rebounds in the Raptors' 101–99 loss to the Portland Trail Blazers. On February 8, Thomas scored a career-high 15 points in a 119–118 win over the Brooklyn Nets. On February 23, Thomas bested his career high with 17 points and five 3-pointers in a 127–81 victory against the Indiana Pacers. In the Raptors’ sixth game returning from the suspension of the season due to the COVID-19 pandemic on August 10, Thomas scored a career-high 22 points, hitting 4 three-pointers, in a 114–106 win over the Milwaukee Bucks in the Orlando bubble.

Utah Jazz (2021)
On March 25, 2021, the Raptors traded Thomas to the Utah Jazz for a future second-round draft pick. On April 28, Thomas scored a season-high 17 points on 7-of-7 shooting from the field and 1-of-1 from the three in a 154–105 win over the Sacramento Kings. On August 1, he was waived by the Jazz.

Chicago Bulls (2021–2022)
On September 8, 2021, Thomas signed with the Chicago Bulls. With 13 players out of the lineup due to COVID-19 protocols in December, Thomas saw increased playing time. On December 26, he played 19 minutes, scoring five points, in a 113–105 victory over the Indiana Pacers. The following day, he made three critical 3-pointers in 19 minutes on the floor in a 130–118 victory over the Atlanta Hawks.

Career statistics

NBA

Regular season

|-
| align=center | 
| align=left | Toronto
| 41 || 1 || 10.7 || .487 || .475 || .750 || 1.5 || .5 || .2 || .0 || 4.9
|-
| align=center | 
| align=left | Toronto
| 26 || 0 || 7.4 || .387 || .415 || .857 || .8 || .3 || .1 || .0 || 2.7
|-
| align=center | 
| align=left | Utah
| 19 || 0 || 7.1 || .400 || .256 || .857 || 1.2 || .5 || .1 || .0 || 3.6
|-
| align=center | 
| align=left | Chicago
| 40 || 0 || 11.5 || .410 || .385 || .800 || 1.3 || .5 || .2 || .1 || 4.0
|- class="sortbottom"
| style="text-align:center;" colspan="2"|Career
| 126 || 1 || 9.7 || .433 || .404 || .804 || 1.2 || .5 || .2 || .0 || 4.0

Playoffs

|-
| align=left | 2020
| align=left | Toronto
| 10 || 0 || 8.4 || .619 || .417 || — || 1.4 || .7 || .1 || .1 || 3.1
|-
| align=left | 2021
| align=left | Utah
| 3 || 0 || 2.3 || .000 || — || — || .3 || .0 || .0 || .0 || .0
|- class="sortbottom"
| style="text-align:center;" colspan="2"|Career
| 13 || 0 || 7.0 || .565 || .417 || — || 1.2 || .5 || .1 || .1 || 2.4

Liga ACB

|-
| align=center | 2017-18
| align=left | Obradoiro CAB 
| Liga ACB
| 30 || 26.5 || .472 || .459 || .944 || 2.4 || 2.4 || .8 || .0 || 15.4 ||
|-
| align=center | 2018-19
| align=left | Valencia Basket 
| Liga ACB
| 29 || 19.8 || .512 || .485 || .846 || 1.6 || 1.6 || .4 || .0 || 11.5 ||

EuroCup

|-
| align=center | 2018-19
| align=left | Valencia Basket 
| EuroCup
| 23 || 21.7 || .518 || .478 || .909 || 1.3 || 1.7 || .5 || .0 || 12.7 || 10.9

College

|-
| style="text-align:left;"|2013–14
| style="text-align:left;"|Iowa State
| 36 || 15 || 21.2 || .367 || .336 || .667 || 1.1 || 1.1 || .6 || .2 || 5.5
|-
| style="text-align:left;"|2014–15
| style="text-align:left;"|Iowa State
| 32 || 0 || 15.3 || .368 || .330 || .714 || 2 || .7 || .3 || .1 || 4.9 
|-
| style="text-align:left;"|2015–16
| style="text-align:left;"|Iowa State
| 35 || 27 || 33.6 || .440 || .432 || .902 || 4.4 || 1.7 || .8 || .2 || 11.0
|-
| style="text-align:left;"|2016–17
| style="text-align:left;"|Iowa State
| 35 || 35 || 30.9 || .477 || .445 || .891 || 3.9 || 1.7 || .9 || .1 || 12.3
|- class"sortbottom"
| style="text-align:center;" colspan="2"|Career
| 138 || 77 || 25.4 || .427 || .401 || .815 || 3.1 || 1.3 || .7 || .2 || 8.5

References

External links

 Matt Thomas at acb.com 
 Matt Thomas at euroleague.net
 Iowa State Cyclones bio
 ESPN.com profile

1994 births
Living people
American expatriate basketball people in Canada
American expatriate basketball people in Spain
American men's basketball players
Baseball players from Illinois
Basketball players from Wisconsin
Chicago Bulls players
Iowa State Cyclones men's basketball players
Liga ACB players
Obradoiro CAB players
People from Onalaska, Wisconsin
Shooting guards
Sportspeople from Decatur, Illinois
Toronto Raptors players
Undrafted National Basketball Association players
Utah Jazz players
Valencia Basket players